The following is a list of notable deaths in June 2019.

Entries for each day are listed alphabetically by surname. A typical entry lists information in the following sequence:
 Name, age, country of citizenship at birth, subsequent country of citizenship (if applicable), reason for notability, cause of death (if known), and reference.

June 2019

1
Camille Billops, 85, American sculptor, filmmaker, archivist and printmaker.
Leah Chase, 96, American Creole chef.
Glen Cressman, 84, Canadian ice hockey player (Montreal Canadiens).
Nikola Dinev, 65, Bulgarian Olympic wrestler, world champion (1977, 1982).
Stephen Heilmann, 77, Greenlandic politician and journalist.
Lee Shin Cheng, 79, Malaysian oil executive and property developer (IOI Group).
Christobel Mattingley, 87, Australian writer.
John Myers, 60, British radio executive (GMG Radio, Radio Academy) and presenter, cancer.
Sibongile Judith Nkomo, 63, South African politician, Secretary-General of the Inkatha Freedom Party and MP.
Charles Reid, 81, American painter.
José Antonio Reyes, 35, Spanish footballer (Sevilla, Atlético Madrid, national team), traffic collision.
Michel Serres, 88, French philosopher, theorist and writer.
Harry C. Triandis, 92, Greek-born American psychologist.
Fons van de Vijver, 66, Dutch psychologist, brain haemorrhage.
Alasdair Walker, 62, British physician and naval officer, brain cancer.
Matt Wrbican, 60, American archivist and writer, brain cancer.
Ani Yudhoyono, 66, Indonesian socialite, First Lady (2004–2014), leukaemia.

2
Momtazuddin Ahmed, 84, Bangladeshi playwright and educationist.
Yannick Bellon, 95, French film director (Rape of Love).
Luigi Biscardi, 90, Italian politician, Senator (1992–2001), Mayor of Larino (1956–1960).
Steven Allan Boggs, 72, American scientist, brain cancer.
Piet Botha, 63, South African rock musician, pancreatic cancer.
Alistair Browning, 65, New Zealand actor (The Lord of the Rings, Vertical Limit, Power Rangers Dino Charge), cancer.
Neeta Choudhary, 50, Indian politician, MLA (2010–2015), complications from blast injuries.
Anto Clarke, 75, Irish Olympic judoka (1972).
P. K. Dharmalingam, 84, Indian cricketer (Madras, Services).
Donald M. Fraser, 95, American politician, member of the U.S. House of Representatives (1963–1979), Mayor of Minneapolis (1980–1994).
Jacob W. Gruber, 98, American archaeologist and anthropologist.
Barry Hughes, 81, Welsh football manager (Go Ahead Eagles, Sparta Rotterdam, HFC Haarlem).
Iftikhar-ul-Hasan Kandhlawi, 97, Indian Islamic scholar.
Alexey Kazannik, 77, Russian lawyer and politician, Prosecutor General (1993–1994) and Deputy Governor of Omsk Oblast (1995–2003).
Jerry Krall, 92, American football player (Detroit Lions).
Lee Siu-kei, 69, Hong Kong actor, liver cancer.
Luisinho Lemos, 67, Brazilian football player and manager (America), heart attack.
Walter Lübcke, 65, German politician, shot.
Henry T. Lynch, 91, American physician and cancer genetic researcher, namesake of Lynch syndrome.
Ken Matthews, 84, English race walker, Olympic champion (1964).
Arthur A. McGiverin, 90, American judge, Justice of the Iowa Supreme Court (1978–2000).
Nazmul Huda Mintu, 76, Bangladeshi film director.
Stuart Mustow, 90, British civil engineer.
Lowell North, 89, American sailor, five-time world champion, Olympic champion (1968).
Mart Nutt, 57, Estonian politician and historian, MP (since 1992).
Maciej Parowski, 72, Polish science fiction writer and editor (Nowa Fantastyka).
Don Pederson, 90, American politician, member of the Nebraska Legislature (1996–2007), pancreatic cancer.
Noa Pothoven, 17, Dutch mental health activist and author, voluntary starvation.
Alan Rollinson, 76, British racing driver, cancer.
Mahmoud Soufi, 47, Qatari footballer (national team).

3
Syed Waseem Akhtar, 62, Pakistani politician, member of the Provincial Assembly of the Punjab.
Hans Ankum, 88, Dutch legal scholar.
Atsushi Aoki, 41, Japanese professional wrestler (AJPW, NOAH), traffic collision.
Javier Barreda Jara, 52, Peruvian politician, Minister of Labor and Promotion of Employment (2018), heart attack.
Larry Beck, 79, American golfer.
David Bergland, 83, American politician, chair of the Libertarian National Committee (1977–1981, 1998–2000), prostate cancer.
Agustina Bessa-Luís, 96, Portuguese writer.
Jean-Louis Bodin, 75, French racing cyclist.
Ellen Bree Burns, 95, American senior judge, (former chief) judge of the Federal District Court for the District of Connecticut (1988–1992).
Ian Craft, 81, British physician.
Roy Cruttenden, 94, British Olympic long jumper (1956).
Paul Darrow, 78, English actor (Blake's 7, Doctor Who).
Fabrizio Fabbri, 70, Italian racing cyclist.
Guy François, 71, Haitian footballer (Violette, national team), heart attack.
Evangelina García Prince, 84, Venezuelan women's rights activist, politician and academic, Senator (1988–1991, 1994–1996) and member of the Comisión para la Reforma del Estado.
He Yi-hang, 62, Taiwanese television host and actor, colorectal cancer.
Jurica Jerković, 69, Croatian footballer (Hajduk Split, Zürich, Yugoslavia national team).
Duchess Woizlawa Feodora of Mecklenburg, 100, German royal.
Simjon Rosenfeld, 96, Polish-born Israeli Holocaust survivor.
Michael Rumaker, 87, American writer.
Tang Dingyuan, 99, Chinese physicist, academician of the Chinese Academy of Sciences.
Ruma Guha Thakurta, 84, Indian actress and singer.
Stanley Tigerman, 88, American architect (Illinois Holocaust Museum and Education Center), chronic obstructive pulmonary disease.
Stanisław Wróblewski, 59, Polish Olympic wrestler (1980).

4
Alene S. Ammond, 86, American politician, New Jersey Senator (1974–1978), pneumonia.
Keith Birdsong, 59, American illustrator (Star Trek, Shadowrun), complications of cerebral hemorrhage from traffic collision.
Emerson Cole, 91, American football player (Cleveland Browns, Chicago Bears).
Linda Collins-Smith, 57, American politician, member of the Arkansas House of Representatives (2011–2013) and Senate (2015–2019), shot.
Roger Covell, 88, Australian musicologist, critic and author.
George Darwin, 87, English footballer (Derby County).
Léonard Dhejju, 88, Congolese Roman Catholic prelate, Bishop of Uvira (1981–1984) and Bunia (1984–2002).
Billy Gabor, 97, American basketball player (Syracuse Orangemen, Syracuse Nationals).
Robin Herd, 80, British engineer, designer and businessman, co-founder of March Engineering.
Teruko Ishizaka, 92, Japanese immunologist, pneumonia.
Lennart Johansson, 89, Swedish sports official, president of UEFA (1990–2007).
Max Kay, 82, Scottish-born Australian entertainer and manager (Andy Stewart), pneumonia as a complication of cancer.
Lawrie Leslie, 84, Scottish footballer (Hibernian, Stoke City, national team).
Zakaria Ben Mustapha, 93, Tunisian politician, Mayor of Tunis (1980–1986) and Minister of Culture (1986–1988).
John Neff, 87, American investor.
Joe Overstreet, 85, American painter.
Nechama Rivlin, 73, Israeli academic and scientist, First Lady (since 2014), complications from lung transplant.
Antoni Roig Muntaner, 87, Spanish chemist and politician.
Geevarghese Mar Timotheos, 91, Indian Eastern Catholic prelate, Bishop of Tiruvalla (1988–2003).

5
Dinyar Contractor, 79, Indian actor (Mujhse Shaadi Karogi, Chori Chori Chupke Chupke, Dam Dama Dam).
David Y. Copeland III, 88, American politician, member of the Tennessee House of Representatives (1968–1992).
Noël Desaubliaux, 96, French Olympic sailor (1960).
Claire Donovan, 71, British historian.
Robert Earle, 93, American game show host (College Bowl).
Aubrey Gatewood, 80, American baseball player (Los Angeles/California Angels, Atlanta Braves).
Leo Houtsonen, 60, Finnish footballer (KuPS Kuopio, OPS Oulu, national team).
Alejandro Jadresic, 62, Chilean engineer and politician, Minister of Energy (1994–1998), brain cancer.
Jan Karwecki, 70, Polish footballer (Lech Poznań, Szombierki Bytom, national team).
Wilfried Kohlars, 79, German footballer (TSV 1860 Munich).
Geoff Lees, 85, English footballer (Barnsley, Bradford City).
Raymond Louw, 92, South African journalist.
John Lynch, 85, Irish Gaelic footballer (Roscommon).
Johnny McGrath, 87–88, Irish hurler (Tipperary).
Mohamed Negm, 75, Egyptian actor and comedian, stroke.
Jonathan Nichols, 53, American politician, member of the Oklahoma Senate (2001–2013), shot.
Lloyd John Ogilvie, 88, American Presbyterian minister, Chaplain of the U.S. Senate (1995–2003).
Prakash Pant, 58, Indian politician, Finance Minister of Uttarakhand (since 2017), cancer.
Sir David Plastow, 87, British automobile and medical research executive.
Albert Rohan, 83, Austrian diplomat, Permanent Secretary of the Austrian Foreign Minister (1996–2001).
Herbert Sandler, 87, American banker (Golden West Financial).
Elio Sgreccia, 90, Italian Roman Catholic cardinal, President of Pontifical Academy for Life (2005–2008).
Stan Smith, 94, Australian footballer (Collingwood).
Peter Toogood, 89, Australian amateur golfer.
Marino Venturini, 74–75, Sammarinese politician, Captain Regent (1976, 1982, 1986, 1995–1996).

6
Joan Callahan, 76, American philosopher, liver cancer.
Sharon Cather, 71, American art historian.
John Gunther Dean, 93, American diplomat.
Dr. John, 77, American Hall of Fame singer-songwriter ("I Walk on Guilded Splinters", "Right Place, Wrong Time"), heart attack.
Maida Heatter, 102, American pastry chef.
Alexander Kuznetsov, 59, Russian-born American actor (The Alaska Kid, The Peacemaker, Space Cowboys).
Dave Marshall, 76, American baseball player (New York Mets, San Francisco Giants).
Rolf Maurer, 81, Swiss road racing cyclist.
Schubert M. Ogden, 91, American theologian.
Bolesław Pylak, 97, Polish Roman Catholic prelate, Bishop and Archbishop of Lublin (1975–1997).
Johnny Robinson, 83, English footballer (Bury, Oldham Athletic).
Enver Sajjad, 84, Pakistani playwright.
M. Sathyanarayana, 74, Indian politician, MLA (2008–2013).
Seiko Tanabe, 91, Japanese author, cholangitis.
Harry Thomson, 85, Malawian politician.
Jota Mario Valencia, 63, Colombian television presenter, stroke.
Ned Wheeler, 87, Irish hurler (Wexford).

7
Noémi Ban, 96, Hungarian-born American public speaker and Holocaust survivor.
Jules Blattner, 78, American singer and guitarist.
Ryszard Bugajski, 76, Polish film director (Interrogation, Clearcut, Generał Nil).
Eva Côté, 85, Canadian politician, MP (1980–1984).
Franklyn Edwards, 81, Montserratian cricketer.
Nello Governato, 80, Italian footballer (Lazio, Como, Savona).
Nonnie Griffin, 85, Canadian actress (The Believers, Good Fences, If You Could See What I Hear) and voice actress, ruptured aortic aneurysm.
Narciso Ibáñez Serrador, 83, Uruguayan-born Spanish film director (The House That Screamed, Who Can Kill a Child?, Historias para no dormir), urinary tract infection.
Elisabeta Ionescu, 66, Romanian Olympic handball player, world championship silver medalist (1973).
Noel Lloyd, 72, Welsh academic, vice-chancellor of Aberystwyth University (2004–2011).
Zhanneta Metallidi, 85, Russian composer and music educator.
Julie Payne, 78, American actress (Island of the Blue Dolphins, Don't Make Waves), chronic obstructive pulmonary disease.
Elżbieta Porzec, 74, Polish volleyball player (national team), Olympic bronze medalist (1968).
Tony Rodham, 64, American presidential campaigner (1992, 2008, 2016) and business consultant.
Donald E. Wilkes Jr., 74, American legal scholar.

8
Milan Asadurov, 69, Bulgarian science fiction writer.
Lucho Avilés, 81, Uruguayan-born Argentine entertainment journalist.
Jenny Berthelius, 95, Swedish author. 
Wim Betz, 76, Belgian physician.
Spencer Bohren, 69, American roots guitarist, prostate cancer.
Guy Bois, 84, French historian.
Jorge Brovetto, 86, Uruguayan engineer, academic and politician, President of Broad Front (2004–2012) and Minister of Education and Culture (2005–2008).
John Causby, 76, Australian cricketer (South Australia).
Adelaide M. Cromwell, 99, American sociologist.
Amitha de Costa, 70, Sri Lankan cricketer (Sri Lanka).
Norman Dewis, 98, British racing driver and engineer (Jaguar Cars).
Justin Edinburgh, 49, English football player (Tottenham Hotspur) and manager (Leyton Orient), cardiac arrest.
Arthur Frackenpohl, 95, American composer.
Kiron Kumar Gogoi, 64, Indian politician, MLA (1985–1991).
Helmut Haid, 80, Austrian Olympic athlete (1964).
Bob Henderson, 85, Australian footballer (Fitzroy).
Karl Hurm, 88, German painter.
Marja Leinonen, 73, Finnish linguist.
Stefano Li Side, 92, Chinese clandestine Roman Catholic prelate, Bishop of Tianjin (since 1982).
Frank Lucchesi, 92, American baseball player, coach and manager (Texas Rangers).
Pierre Mambele, 74, Congolese taxi driver.
Andre Matos, 47, Brazilian singer (Viper, Angra, Shaman), heart attack.
Renzo Patria, 85, Italian politician, Deputy (1979–2006).
Eric Patterson, 26, American football player (Indianapolis Colts, New England Patriots), shot.
Abdul Baset al-Sarout, 27, Syrian footballer and militant, shot.
Yehuda Talit, 74, Israeli businessman and record producer.
Willie Williams, 67, American karateka, heart disease.

9
Humberto Álvarez, 89, Colombian footballer (Atlético Nacional, Deportivo Cali, Independiente Medellín).
İbrahim Balaban, 98, Turkish painter, multiple organ failure.
Yves Bot, 71, French magistrate, Advocate General of the European Court of Justice (since 2006).
Bill Bryant, 78, English rugby league player (Castleford).
Bushwick Bill, 52, Jamaican-American rapper (Geto Boys), pancreatic cancer.
Pádraig Carney, 91, Irish Gaelic footballer (Mayo).
Ahmed Essop, 87, Indian-born South African writer.
Erla Bergendahl Hohler, 81, Norwegian archaeologist and art historian.
Erich Iltgen, 78, German politician, president of the Landtag of Saxony (1990–2009).
Maryon Kantaroff, 85, Canadian sculptor, complications from pneumonia.
László Lantos, 80, Hungarian Olympic swimmer (1960).
Ma Ju-lung, 80, Taiwanese actor (Cape No. 7, Monga, Warriors of the Rainbow: Seediq Bale), infection.
Mary Max, 52, American animal rights activist.
Rafael Miguel, 22, Brazilian actor (Chiquititas), shot.
Adela Neffa, 96, Argentine-born Uruguayan sculptor.
Joe Dan Osceola, 82, American Seminole tribal chief.
Prabhakar Rao, 83, Indian cricketer (Madras).
Gerlind Reinshagen, 93, German writer.
Helge Stormorken, 96, Norwegian veterinarian.
Juhani Wahlsten, 81, Finnish ice hockey player.
Wang Hanru, 81, Chinese major general and politician.
William D. Wittliff, 79, American screenwriter (Lonesome Dove, Legends of the Fall, The Perfect Storm), heart attack.
Xu Datong, 90, Chinese political scientist and legal scholar.

10
Beatrice Arbour, 98, American baseball player (Racine Belles).
Elizabeth Barrett-Connor, 84, American epidemiologist, cerebral vascular disease.
Tom Derek Bowden, 97, British military officer.
Lewis E. Braverman, 90, American endocrinologist, Waldenström's macroglobulinemia.
Yuzuru Fujimoto, 83, Japanese voice actor (Gigantor, Brave Raideen, The Big O), heart failure.
Hao Yun, 94, Chinese translator, recipient of the Lifetime Achievement Award in Translation.
Klaus Hahn, 93, German Olympic rower (1952).
R. V. Janakiraman, 78, Indian politician, Chief Minister of Puducherry (1996–2000).
Mohammed Sobhi al-Judeili, 36, Palestinian paramedic, shot.
Girish Karnad, 81, Indian film director (Godhuli), actor (Samskara, Komaram Puli) and screenwriter.
David Orr King, 81, American politician.
Harold Lawson, 81–82, American-Swedish computer engineer.
Lee Hee-ho, 96, South Korean women's rights and peace activist, First Lady (1998–2003), liver cancer.
Mario Mangiarotti, 98, Italian fencer.
Crazy Mohan, 66, Indian actor (Michael Madhana Kamarajan, Thedinen Vanthathu, Vasool Raja MBBS), heart attack.
Ib Nørholm, 88, Danish composer and organist.
Sven-David Sandström, 76, Swedish composer (Jeppe: The Cruel Comedy), cancer.
Akhtar Sarfraz, 43, Pakistani cricketer (national team), colon cancer.
David Sawyier, 68, American Olympic rower.
Alireza Shir Mohammad Ali, 21, Iranian political prisoner, stabbed.
Paul Sinegal, 75, American zydeco and blues guitarist and singer.
Michel Sitjar, 76, French rugby player (Sporting Union Agenais, XIII Catalan, national team), suicide.
Sherman Utsman, 87, American racing driver (NASCAR).
Wang Jun, 78, Chinese business executive, Chairman of the Poly Group and the CITIC Group.
Peter Whitehead, 82, English writer and filmmaker (Wholly Communion, Charlie Is My Darling, Tonite Let's All Make Love in London).
Cecil Woolf, 92, English author and publisher.
Yang Yang, 44, Chinese tenor, suicide by jumping.

11
Roberto Bailey, 66, Honduran footballer (Victoria, Marathón, national team), traffic collision.
Carl Bertelsen, 81, Danish footballer (Esbjerg, Kilmarnock, national team), complications from Alzheimer's disease.
Yvan Delsarte, 90, Belgian Olympic basketball player (1952).
Domenico De Simone, 93, Italian politician, Mayor of Torremaggiore (1960–1976), Senator (1976–1979) and Deputy (1979–1983).
Martin Feldstein, 79, American economist, Chairman of the Council of Economic Advisers (1982–1984).
Gabriele Grunewald, 32, American middle-distance runner, salivary gland cancer.
Abul Hasnat, 64, Indian politician.
Mohaqiq Kabuli, 91, Afghan Grand Ayatollah.
Billy McKee, 97, Irish republican, founding member and leader of the Provisional Irish Republican Army.
Enrico Nascimbeni, 59, Italian singer, journalist and poet, heart attack.
William Newman, 80, British computer scientist.
Velvel Pasternak, 85, Canadian-born American musicologist.
Francisco Miró Quesada Cantuarias, 100, Peruvian philosopher, journalist and politician, minister of public education of Peru (1963–1964).
Riazuddin, 60, Pakistani cricket umpire, heart attack.
Robert Sorrells, 88, American actor (Gunsmoke, Bonanza, The Twilight Zone) and convicted murderer.
Valeria Valeri, 97, Italian actress (Seasons of Our Love, Catherine and I, Un medico in famiglia).

12
Don Benson, 99, Australian rules footballer.
Gattu Bheemudu, 67, Indian politician, MLA (1999–2004).
Thandi Brewer, South African filmmaker, breast cancer.
Gary Burrell, 81, American electronics executive and philanthropist, chairman and co-founder of Garmin.
Chang Liyi, 89, Taiwanese pilot (ROCAF), member of the Black Cat Squadron, heart attack.
Merv Collins, 85, Canadian football player (Toronto Argonauts, Ottawa Rough Riders).
Armand De Decker, 70, Belgian lawyer and politician, President of the Senate (1999–2004, 2007–2010).
Te'o J. Fuavai, 82, American Samoan politician, former Senator, Speaker of the American Samoa House of Representatives (1975–19??).
Fredrik Hagemann, 90, Norwegian geologist.
Bridgette Jordan, 30, American record holder, world's shortest woman (2011).
Léon Kalenga Badikebele, 62, Congolese Roman Catholic prelate, Apostolic Nuncio to Argentina (since 2018) and Archbishop of Magnetum (since 2008).
Philomena Lynott, 88, Irish author, lung cancer.
Wilbert J. McKeachie, 98, American psychologist.
Sylvia Miles, 94, American actress (Midnight Cowboy, Farewell, My Lovely, She-Devil).
Bob Mitchell, 86, American baseball player (Kansas City Monarchs).
Julia Munro, 76, Canadian politician, member of the Legislative Assembly of Ontario (1995–2018).
Elfriede Ott, 94, Austrian actress (Hallo – Hotel Sacher … Portier!, The Unintentional Kidnapping of Mrs. Elfriede Ott) and singer.
Ray Rigby, 96, American politician, member of the Idaho Senate (1965–1974).
Igor Solopov, 58, Russian-born Estonian Olympic table tennis player (1992), European championship bronze medalist (1978).
Tsuruko Yamazaki, 94, Japanese avant-garde artist, member of the Gutai group.
Yozo Yokota, 78, American-Japanese lawyer and professor.

13
Irena Backus, 69, Polish-born Swiss historian, complications from a stroke.
Pat Bowlen, 75, American Hall of Fame sports executive, majority owner of the Denver Broncos (since 1984), complications from Alzheimer's disease.
Pierre DuMaine, 87, American Roman Catholic prelate, Bishop of San Jose (1981–1999).
Ron Ferri, 86, American artist. 
Nature Ganganbaigal, 29, Chinese-Mongolian folk-rock musician (Tengger Cavalry) and composer.
Edith González, 54, Mexican actress (Sí, mi amor, Bianca Vidal, Doña Bárbara) and dancer, ovarian cancer.
Derrick Harris, 54, American music producer, kidney failure.
Şeref Has, 82, Turkish footballer (Fenerbahçe, national team).
A. Rahman Hassan, 73, Malaysian singer and composer.
Derek Henderson, 93, English cricketer.
Bourkou Louise Kabo, 84, Chadian politician, first woman Deputy (1962–1964).
Edwin Michael Kosik, 94, American senior judge, member of the U.S. District Court for Middle Pennsylvania (since 1986).
Licelott Marte de Barrios, 85, Dominican politician, Minister of Finance (1990–1993) and Deputy (2002–2006), cancer.
Sean McCann, 83, Canadian actor (Night Heat, Tommy Boy, Naked Lunch), complications from heart disease.
Menifee, 23, American racehorse, heart attack.
R. Clayton Mitchell Jr., 83, American politician, member (1971–1992) and speaker of the Maryland House of Delegates (1987–1992).
Rosario Parmegiani, 82, Italian water polo player, Olympic champion (1960).
Joyce Pensato, 77, American painter.
Jiří Pospíšil, 68, Czech Olympic basketball player (1972, 1976, 1980).
Pazhavila Rameshan, 83, Indian journalist and poet.
Heinrich Reichert, 69, Swiss neurobiologist.
Raul Ruiz, 78, American journalist and civil rights activist.
Wilhelm Wieben, 84, German journalist (Tagesschau), actor and author.

14
Laura Almerich, 79, Spanish classical guitarist (Lluis Llach).
Maurice Bénichou, 76, French actor (Animal, Amélie, Time of the Wolf).
Roger Béteille, 97, French aeronautical engineer and businessman.
Roland Boudreau, 83, Canadian politician, MLA (1974–1978).
Elio Cruz, 87, Gibraltarian playwright, singer and songwriter.
Francis P. Facione, 79, American prelate (since 1975).
George E. Felton, 98, British computer scientist, developer of GEORGE operating system.
Babayo Garba Gamawa, 53, Nigerian politician.
Rod Hall, 81, American off-road racing driver, progressive supranuclear palsy.
Bernard M. Judge, 79, American newspaper editor (Chicago Sun-Times), pancreatic cancer.
Ricardo Migliorisi, 71, Paraguayan painter and designer.
Ning Bin, 60, Chinese control systems engineer, President of Beijing Jiaotong University (2008–2019), traffic collision.
Vaira Paegle, 76, Latvian politician and diaspora activist.
Dhaniram Paudel, 53, Nepalese politician, heart attack.
K. Rathamani, 70, Indian politician, MLA (since 2016), stomach cancer.
Martin Roth, 41, Austrian artist.
S. Sivasubramanian, 81, Indian politician, MLA (1989–1991).
Kelvin Thomas, 99, Welsh conductor, composer and author.
Butsaran Thongchiew, 28, Thai singer and actress.
Ebert Van Buren, 94, American football player (Philadelphia Eagles).
James Wyngaarden, 94, American physician and academic administrator, director of the National Institutes of Health (1982–1989).

15
Daniel Colin, 85, French politician, Deputy (1986–1997).
David Esterly, 75, American woodcarver, amyotrophic lateral sclerosis.
Larry Foss, 83, American baseball player (Pittsburgh Pirates, New York Mets).
Marta Harnecker, 82, Chilean sociologist, politologist and journalist.
Jane Hayward, 69, British actress.
Wilhelm Holzbauer, 88, Austrian architect.
Susannah Hunnewell, 52, American editor and publisher (The Paris Review), cancer.
Kevin Killian, 66, American poet, cancer.
Charles A. Reich, 91, American scholar and author (The Greening of America).
Josl Rieder, 86, Austrian Olympic alpine skier (1956), world champion (1958).
Beatriz Salomón, 65, Argentine actress, television presenter and singer, colon cancer.
Wes Stewart, 74, Jamaican-born English cricketer (Middlesex).
John Wilson, 79, Australian VFL footballer (Richmond).
Neville Tong, 84–85, English cyclist, heart attack
Franco Zeffirelli, 96, Italian film and stage director (Romeo and Juliet, Jesus of Nazareth, The Taming of the Shrew) and Senator (1994–2001).
Joseph Zammit, 86, Australian Olympic wrestler (1956).

16
Frederick Andermann, 88, Ukrainian-born Canadian neurologist and epileptologist.
Alan Brinkley, 70, American historian, complications from frontotemporal dementia.
Bishop Bullwinkle, 70, American singer ("Hell to the Naw Naw") and comedian, heart attack.
John Charles, 75, American football player (Boston Patriots, Minnesota Vikings, Houston Oilers).
Kelly Coleman, 80, American basketball player (Harlem Globetrotters, Chicago Majors, Baltimore Bullets).
Wolfgang Danne, 77, German figure skater, Olympic bronze medalist (1968).
Paulino do Livramento Évora, 87, Cape Verdean Roman Catholic prelate, Bishop of Santiago de Cabo Verde (1975–2009).
Feng Chuanhan, 105, Chinese orthopaedic surgeon, Vice President of Beijing Medical College (1980–1985).
Charles Ginnever, 87, American sculptor.
Erzsébet Gulyás-Köteles, 94, Hungarian gymnast, Olympic silver medallist (1948, 1952) and champion (1956).
Frank LaMere, 69, American Winnebago activist, bile duct cancer.
Adam Litovitz, 36, Canadian musician and composer (Year of the Carnivore, Octavio Is Dead!).
Steve Maaranen, 72, American Olympic cyclist (1968).
Brenda Maddox, 87, American journalist and biographer.
Simona Mafai De Pasquale, 90, Italian politician, Senator (1976–1979), stroke.
Molly O'Neill, 66, American food writer.
Suzan Pitt, 75, American animator and painter, cancer.
Francine Shapiro, 71, American psychologist, developer of eye movement desensitization and reprocessing.
Monte Shelton, 85, American racing driver (Can-Am, Trans-Am), pancreatic cancer.
Charles Wyrsch, 98, Swiss painter.

17
Knut Andersen, 88, Norwegian film director (Scorched Earth).
Andrew Anderson, 74, American basketball player.
Philipp Bobkov, 93, Russian intelligence officer (KGB).
Michael Branch, 79, British linguist and academic administrator.
Kiril Cenevski, 76, Macedonian film director (Black Seed).
Jerome Ch'en, 99, Chinese-Canadian historian.
Shlomi Eyal, 59, Israeli Olympic fencer (1984).
Moacyr Grechi, 83, Brazilian Roman Catholic prelate, Archbishop of Porto Velho (1998–2011).
Friederike de Haas, 74, German politician, member of the Landtag of Saxony (1990–2009).
Darwin Hindman, 86, American politician, mayor of Columbia, Missouri (1995–2010), lung disease.
Jean-Marie Hullot, 65, French computer scientist and programmer (Apple Inc.).
Somchai Khunpluem, 81, Thai mobster and politician, colon cancer.
Kung Hsiang-fu, 76, Chinese molecular biologist and virologist, member of the Academy of Sciences.
Yehuda Levi, 93, American-Israeli rabbi and writer.
Ian MacFarlane, 86, Scottish football player (Aberdeen, Chelsea) and manager (Carlisle United).
Mohamed Morsi, 67, Egyptian politician, President (2012–2013), heart attack.
Pierre Pardoën, 88, French racing cyclist.
Sascha Pohflepp, 41, German artist.
Clemens C. J. Roothaan, 100, Dutch chemist and physicist, developer of Roothaan equations.
Salvatore Senese, 84, Italian magistrate and politician, Deputy (1992–1994) and Senator (1994–2001).
Robert Therrien, 71, American sculptor.
Gloria Vanderbilt, 95, American socialite, artist and fashion designer, stomach cancer.
Remo Vigni, 80, Italian footballer (Brescia, Monza, Padova).
Henk Vonk, 77, Dutch football player (DOS) and coach.
Christian Wägli, 84, Swiss Olympic sprinter (1960).

18
Stephen Blaire, 77, American Roman Catholic prelate, Bishop of Stockton (1999–2018).
Pavel Chihaia, 97, Romanian novelist and political dissident.
Irene Coates, 94, English author.
Bill Deacon, 75, New Zealand rugby league player (Waikato, national team).
Tom Dillon, 93, Irish Gaelic footballer (Galway, Ahascragh).
François Doubin, 86, French politician, mayor of Argentan (1989–2001).
Donald E. Hines, 85, American politician, member (1993–2008) and President of the Louisiana State Senate (2004–2008).
Alf Hughes, 88, Australian VFL footballer (Hawthorn).
Shona Dunlop MacTavish, 99, New Zealand dancer and choreographer.
Obedingwa Mguni, 56, Zimbabwean politician, MP (since 2013).
Gyp Mills, 72, English sculptor and songwriter.
Warren Niesłuchowski, 72, German-born Polish-American nomadic lifestyle artist and writer.
Molara Ogundipe, 78, Nigerian writer and women's rights activist.
Milton Quon, 105, American animator (Fantasia, Dumbo) and actor (Speed).
Maria Giuseppa Robucci, 116, Italian supercentenarian, Europe's oldest person.
Patrick Smith, 55, American kickboxer and mixed martial artist, urothelial bladder cancer.
Gerry Spiess, 79, American sailor.
Vladimir Stoyanov, 54, Bulgarian footballer (Chernomorets Burgas, Lokomotiv Sofia, national team).
Willem van Eijk, 77, Dutch convicted serial killer.
Mladen Vranic, 89, Croatian Canadian Scientist and Medical Researcher, congestive heart failure.

19
Christine Barnetson, 71, Australian Olympic swimmer (1964).
Filipe Bole, 82, Fijian politician, Minister for Foreign Affairs (1987–1988, 1992–1994, 1994–1997) and Deputy Prime Minister (1993).
Bobby Brown, 87, Scottish footballer (Workington).
D. K. Chowta, 81, Indian writer and artist.
Ernie Collumbine, 80, Scottish footballer (Clydebank, St Johnstone, East Stirlingshire, Stenhousemuir F.C.).
Etika, 29, American internet personality, suicide by drowning.
Peter Allan Fields, 84, American television writer (Star Trek, The Six Million Dollar Man, The Man from U.N.C.L.E.).
Philip Geier, 84, American businessman, CEO of The Interpublic Group of Companies (1980–2000).
Elemér Gergátz, 77, Hungarian politician and veterinarian, Minister of Agriculture (1991–1993).
Anthony Hedges, 88, English composer.
Lionheart, 36, British professional wrestler (ICW).
David Matthews, 82, English rugby union player (Leicester Tigers).
Angelika Mertens, 66, German politician, member of the Bundestag (1994–2005) and chairwoman of ASB (since 2005).
Peng Xiaolian, 65, Chinese film director (Once Upon a Time in Shanghai, Shanghai Story, Shanghai Rumba).
Jack Renner, 84, American recording engineer (Telarc International Corporation).
Ibrahim Saber, 74, Bangladeshi field hockey player (national team).
Rafael de la Sierra, 70, Spanish politician, President of the Parliament of Cantabria (1999–2003) and Minister of the Presidency and Justice of Cantabria (2015–2019).
Dennis Silk, 87, English cricketer (Cambridge University, Somerset), and chairman of the Test and County Cricket Board (1994–1996).
Pedro Antônio Simeão, 65, Brazilian Olympic footballer (national team), pneumonia.
Norman Stone, 78, Scottish historian and author.
Su Huiyu, 84, Chinese legal scholar.
Dmytro Tymchuk, 46, Ukrainian politician, military expert and blogger, member of the Verkhovna Rada (since 2014), shot.
Ioannis Veryvakis, 88, Greek Army officer.
Dennis White, 70, English footballer (Hartlepool).
Leonid Zamyatin, 97, Russian diplomat, Ambassador to the UK (1986–1991), Director General of TASS (1970–1978).

20
Wibke Bruhns, 80, German journalist.
Bill Collins, 84, Australian film historian, critic and television host (ABC, Network Ten, Fox Classics).
Emanuele Crestini, 46, Italian politician, Mayor of Rocca di Papa (since 2016), complications of burns and smoke inhalation.
Anders Faager, 74, Swedish Olympic sprinter, European indoor champion (1974).
Dumitru Focșeneanu, 83, Romanian Olympic bobsledder (1972), stroke.
Eddie Garcia, 90, Filipino actor (Beast of the Yellow Night, Rainbow's Sunset, Ang Probinsyano), director and television personality, complications from a fall.
Judy Jacobson, 80, American politician, member of the Montana Senate (1981–1996).
Gunther Kress, 78, Austrian-born British semiotician, heart failure.
Peter Matić, 82, Austrian actor (I Learned It from Father, Everyone Dies Alone, Wahnfried).
Gerald Messlender, 57, Austrian footballer (Admira Wacker Wien, national team).
Colin A. Palmer, 75, Jamaican historian.
Gino Pasqualotto, 63, Italian Olympic ice hockey player (1984), cancer.
Jimmy Reardon, 93, Irish Olympic sprinter (1948).
Toufiq M. Seraj, 63, Bangladeshi businessman, President of the Real Estate and Housing Association (2000–2006), heart attack.
Rubén Suñé, 72, Argentine footballer (Boca Juniors, Huracán, national team).
Mark Warawa, 69, Canadian politician, MP (since 2004), pancreatic cancer.
Noel White, 95, Australian rugby league player (national team).
Marion Wilson, 42, American convicted murderer, executed by lethal injection.

21
Peter Ball, 87, English Anglican cleric and convicted sex offender, Bishop of Lewes (1977–1992) and Gloucester (1992–1993).
Susan Bernard, 71, American actress (Faster, Pussycat! Kill! Kill!) and model (Playboy), heart attack.
Ralph Brill, 83, American legal scholar.
Demetris Christofias, 72, Cypriot politician, President (2008–2013), respiratory failure.
Lindsay Drake, 69, Australian rugby league player (Manly Warringah, St. George).
Oleksandr Filiayev, 84, Ukrainian footballer (SKA Lviv, Karpaty Lviv).
Robert Friend, 99, American air force officer.
Bubba Green, 61, American football player (Baltimore Colts), cancer.
Geraldine Harcourt, 67, New Zealand Japanese-English translator.
Jane Hubert, 84, British anthropologist.
Richard N. Levy, 82, American rabbi.
Eugene V. Lux, 92, American politician.
Jan Meyers, 90, American politician, member of the U.S. House of Representatives (1985–1997).
Karen Petch, 50, British television presenter, breast cancer.
Avelino Muñoz Stevenson, 62, Puerto Rican television sportscaster, complications from pulmonary emphysema.
Elliot Roberts, 76, American music executive (Asylum Records) and manager (Neil Young, Joni Mitchell).
Peter Selz, 100, German-born American art historian.
William Simons, 78, Welsh actor (No Place for Jennifer, Where No Vultures Fly, Heartbeat).
Jim Taricani, 69, American investigative journalist (WJAR), kidney failure.
John Vernon, 89, Australian Olympic high jumper.
Paul Winner, 83, English public relations executive.
Peter Winterburn, 57, Canadian geochemist, stabbed.
Harriet Sohmers Zwerling, 91, American writer and artist's model.

22
Arild Berg, 43, Norwegian footballer (Bodø/Glimt), suicide.
Jerry Carrigan, 75, American rock drummer (Elvis Presley, John Denver, Muscle Shoals Rhythm Section).
Vince Costello, 87, American football player (Cleveland Browns).
Miguel Ángel Falasca, 46, Argentine-born Spanish Olympic volleyball player (Pòrtol, Skra Bełchatów, national team) and coach, heart attack.
Pierre Fortier, 86, Canadian politician.
Willy Komen, 77, Kenyan politician, MP (1969–1974, 1975–1979, 1992–2002).
Judith Krantz, 91, American author (Scruples, Princess Daisy, Till We Meet Again).
Leevi Lehto, 68, Finnish poet, translator and programmer, multiple system atrophy.
Robert V. Levine, 73, American psychologist.
Ambachew Mekonnen, Ethiopian politician, President of Amhara Region (since 2019), shot.
Se'are Mekonnen, Ethiopian army officer, Chief of General Staff (since 2018), shot.
Concepción Paredes, 48, Spanish Olympic triple jumper (1996).
Thanjavur R. Ramamoorthy, 90, Indian musician.
Zdeněk Remsa, 90, Czech Olympic ski jumper (1948) and ski jumping coach.
Stepan Shakaryan, 84, Azerbaijani-born Armenian composer.
John Shearer, 72, American photojournalist.
Thalles, 24, Brazilian football player (Vasco da Gama, Ponte Preta, U20 national team), traffic collision.
Geoffrey Tordoff, Baron Tordoff, 90, British businessman and politician, Member of the House of Lords (1981–2016) and President of the Liberal Party (1983–1984).
Tõnis Vint, 77, Estonian graphic artist.
Jolene Watanabe, 50, American tennis player, appendix cancer.

23
Dave Bartholomew, 100, American Hall of Fame musician, bandleader and songwriter ("Ain't That a Shame", "I Hear You Knocking", "I'm Walkin'"), heart failure.
Marv Bevan, 83, Canadian football player (Ottawa Rough Riders). 
William F. Brown, 91, American playwright (The Wiz).
Don Colo, 94, American football player (Cleveland Browns).
Andrey Kharitonov, 59, Russian actor (The Gadfly, The Invisible Man, The Life of Klim Samgin), stomach cancer.
Manus Kelly, 41, Irish rally driver, race collision.
John Kobelke, 69, Australian politician, member of the Western Australian Legislative Assembly (1989–2013).
Helga Lie, 88, Norwegian politician.
Spiro Malas, 86, American bass-baritone opera singer.
Kerry Marbury, 67, American football player (Toronto Argonauts, Ottawa Rough Riders).
Stephanie Niznik, 52, American actress (Everwood, Star Trek: Insurrection, Life Is Wild).
Naomi Quinn, 79, American academic.
Fernando Roldán, 97, Chilean footballer (CD Universidad Católica, national team).
George Rosenkranz, 102, Hungarian-born Mexican chemist.
Jack Rudolph, 82, American football player (Boston Patriots).
Abdul Sattar, 88, Pakistani political scientist and diplomat, Minister of Foreign Affairs (1993, 1999–2002).
Steve Sipek, 77, Croatian-born American actor.
George Strickland, 76, Australian politician, Speaker of the Western Australian Legislative Assembly (1997–2001).
Žarko Varajić, 67, Serbian basketball player (Bosna, Yugoslavia national team) and executive, Olympic silver medallist (1976).

24
Harry Archer, 86, English rugby player (Workington RFC, Workington Town).
Janet Arnott, 63, Canadian curler, world champion (1984), cancer 
Jeff Austin, 45, American mandolinist and singer (Yonder Mountain String Band).
Graham Barnett, 83, English footballer (Port Vale, Halifax Town).
Billy Drago, 73, American actor (The Untouchables, The Adventures of Brisco County, Jr., Pale Rider), complications from a stroke.
Steve Dunleavy, 81, Australian journalist (New York Post).
Iván Erőd, 83, Hungarian-Austrian composer and pianist.
Jonás Gómez Gallo, 95, Chilean businessman and politician, Senator (1961–1969) and Deputy (1957–1961).
Min Hogg, 80, British journalist and interior designer.
José Huerta, 71, Peruvian politician, Minister of Defense (since 2018), heart attack.
Yekaterina Mikhailova-Demina, 93, Russian military doctor.
Al Ogletree, 89, American college baseball coach (Dallas, Sul Ross State, UTRGV Vaqueros).
Madan Lal Saini, 75, Indian politician, member of the Rajya Sabha (since 2018) and Rajasthan Legislative Assembly (1990–1992).
Jörg Stübner, 53, German footballer (Dynamo Dresden, Sachsen Leipzig, East Germany national team).
Brigitte Swoboda, 76, Austrian actress.
Asaminew Tsige, Ethiopian general, suspected plotter of the Amhara Region coup d'état attempt, shot.
Wu Guoqing, 82, Chinese police detective and forensic scientist.

25
Mack Atkins, 87, Australian footballer (Hawthorn).
Tony Barone, 72, American basketball coach (Creighton Bluejays, Texas A&M Aggies, Memphis Grizzlies).
Ken Behring, 91, American real estate developer, philanthropist and football franchise owner (Seattle Seahawks).
Arthur Candy, 85, New Zealand Olympic cyclist (1964).
John Dillon, 76, Irish hurler (Roscrea, Tipperary).
Russ Ewing, 95, American journalist (WLS-TV, WMAQ-TV), bladder cancer.
Giuseppe Fabiani, 92, Italian Roman Catholic prelate, Bishop of Imola (1989–2002).
Ulla Juurola, 77, Finnish politician.
Bruno de Keyzer, 69, French cinematographer (Little Dorrit).
Li Lun, 91, Chinese lieutenant general, Deputy Director of the PLA General Logistics Department.
Alfie Linehan, 79, Irish cricketer.
Bryan Marshall, 81, British actor (The Spy Who Loved Me, Quatermass and the Pit, The Long Good Friday).
Kevin McKenna, 75, Irish republican, chief of staff of the Provisional Irish Republican Army (1983–1997).
Astrid North, 45, German soul singer, pancreatic cancer.
Ivan Prpić, 91, Croatian physician.
Mohan Ranade, 88, Indian freedom fighter.
Isabel Sarli, 89, Argentine actress (Thunder Among the Leaves) and glamour model, Miss Argentina (1955).
Swami Satyamitranand, 86, Indian Hindu spiritual teacher, lung disease.
Roderick Slater, 82, American artist.
Ringaudas Songaila, 90, Lithuanian politician, First Secretary of the Communist Party of Lithuania (1987–1988).
Eerik-Juhan Truuväli, 81, Estonian lawyer and professor, Chancellor of Justice (1993–2000).
Eurig Wyn, 74, Welsh journalist (BBC) and politician, MEP (1999–2004).
Xu Zhongyu, 104, Chinese writer and literary scholar.

26
Ben Barenholtz, 83, Ukrainian-born American film producer (Miller's Crossing, Barton Fink, Requiem for a Dream).
Fletcher Benton, 88, American artist.
Georges Brossard, 79, Canadian entomologist, founder of the Montreal Insectarium, lung cancer.
Carlito Joaquin Cenzon, 80, Filipino Roman Catholic prelate, Bishop of Baguio (2002–2016).
Beth Chapman, 51, American bounty hunter and reality television personality (Dog the Bounty Hunter, Dog and Beth: On the Hunt, Dog's Most Wanted), throat cancer.
Charalambos Cholidis, 62, Greek Greco-Roman wrestler, Olympic bronze medalist (1984, 1988), heart attack.
Ivan Cooper, 75, Northern Irish politician, MP (1969–1974), co-founder of the SDLP.
Alex Cosmidis, 90, American baseball scout, player and manager.
Douglas Fielding, 73, British actor (Z-Cars, EastEnders) and narrator (Nightfall in Middle-Earth).
Tony Hall, 91, British music industry executive, columnist and presenter.
Ian Johnson, 70, Australian television executive (Nine Network, Seven Network).
Anne Johnston, 86, Canadian politician, Toronto City Councillor (1972–1985, 1998–2003).
Gilberte Marin-Moskovitz, 82, French politician.
Gerald McCann, 87, British fashion designer.
Manuel Real, 95, American senior (former chief) judge, member of the U.S. District Court for Central California.
Morteza Saffari Natanzi, 63, Iranian politician, MP (since 2016), pancreatic cancer.
David Pentreath, 86, British Royal Navy officer.
Andrey Sakharov, 89, Russian historian.
Édith Scob, 81, French actress (Eyes Without a Face, Summer Hours, Holy Motors).
Loredana Simioli, 41, Italian actress (L'amore buio, Gorbaciof, Perez.), cancer.
Tadao Takashima, 88, Japanese actor (Atragon, Frankenstein Conquers the World, Son of Godzilla).
Max Wright, 75, American actor (ALF, Reds, All That Jazz), lymphoma.

27
Gualberto Castro, 84, Mexican singer (Los Hermanos Castro) and television personality (La Carabina de Ambrosio), complications from bladder cancer.
Stephan Chase, 74, British actor (Maleficent, Wives and Daughters, Macbeth).
Jharna Dhara Chowdhury, 80, Bangladeshi social activist, cerebral haemorrhage.
Don Frerichs, 88, American politician, member of the Minnesota House of Representatives (1981–1997).
David Golomb, 86, Israeli politician, member of the Knesset (1968–1969, 1977–1981).
Claude Kohler, 87, American Olympic sailor (1960).
Brian Lennard, 84, British executive.
Vukica Mitić, 65, Serbian Olympic basketball player (1980).
Shyam Mitra, 82, Indian cricketer (Bengal), liver disease.
Max Muscle, 56, American professional wrestler (WCW).
Hartmut Nickel, 74, German Olympic ice hockey player (1968).
Vijaya Nirmala, 73, Indian film director (Bezawada Bebbuli) and actress (Bhargavi Nilayam, Rangula Ratnam), heart attack.
Kaj Pindal, 91, Danish-born Canadian animator (What on Earth!, Peep and the Big Wide World).
Justin Raimondo, 67, American author, co-founder and editorial director of Antiwar.com, lung cancer.
Svanhild Salberg, 86, Norwegian politician.
Jānis Skredelis, 79, Latvian football manager (Daugava Riga).
Wallace Stickney, 84, American civil servant, Director of FEMA (1990-1993).
Louis Thiry, 84, French organist and composer.
Tong Daoming, 82, Chinese literary scholar, translator, and playwright.
Peter Westergaard, 88, American composer and music theorist.
Yu Pufan, 96, Chinese computer pioneer.

28
Liaquat Ali Asim, 67, Pakistani poet, heart attack.
Paul Benjamin, 81, American actor (Do the Right Thing, Midnight Cowboy, Born to Win).
Şükrü Birand, 75, Turkish footballer (PTT Ankara, Fenerbahçe), complications from a heart attack.
Abburi Chayadevi, 85, Indian fiction writer.
Jean-Louis Chrétien, 66, French philosopher.
František Čuba, 83, Czech agronomist and politician, Senator (2014–2018), Medal of Merit recipient.
Borislav Džaković, 71, Serbian-Bosnian basketball coach (Partizan, Sloboda Tuzla).
Judith Poxson Fawkes, 77, American tapestry weaver.
Willie Frazer, 58, Northern Irish loyalist activist and victims advocate, cancer.
Mário Jorge da Fonseca Hermes, 92, Brazilian Olympic basketball player (1952).
Charles Levin, 70, American actor (Alice, Hill Street Blues, Capital News), fall.
Lisa Martinek, 47, German actress (Blankenese, The Old Fox, Der Kriminalist), swimming accident.
Delceita Oakley, 75, Panamanian Olympic sprinter (1964).
Brian Rhodes, 68, Australian cricketer (New South Wales).
Tony Sutton, 98, English cricketer (Oxford University, Somerset).

29
Rafael Acosta Arévalo, 50, Venezuelan military officer. 
Jaya Arunachalam, 84, Indian social worker.
David Brink, 71, American Olympic cyclist (1968).
Sir Simon Dawbarn, 95, British diplomat.
Yevheniya Dembska, 98, Ukrainian actress (White Acacia).
Gary Duncan, 72, American rock guitarist (Quicksilver Messenger Service), complications from a seizure.
Dieter Enders, 73, German chemist.
Stewart Greene, 91, American advertising executive, cardiac arrest caused by lung cancer.
Florijana Ismaili, 24, Swiss footballer (BSC YB Frauen, national team), acute asphyxia.
Jeon Mi-seon, 48, South Korean actress (Moon Embracing the Sun, Hide and Seek, Love Is a Crazy Thing), suicide by hanging.
Jiang Chongjing, 103, Chinese politician and academic administrator, President of the NPU and CQUT, Vice Minister of the Fourth Ministry of Machine Building (1978–1982).
Tom Jordan, 82, Irish actor (Fair City).
Jesper Langberg, 78, Danish actor (It's Nifty in the Navy, Me and My Kid Brother, Olsen-banden Junior).
Sir David Maddison, 72, English judge.
Dickson Makwaza, 76, Zambian football player and coach.
Guillermo Mordillo, 86, Argentine cartoonist.
Babu Narayanan, 59, Indian film director (Sthreedhanam, To Noora with Love), cancer.
Ilkka Nummisto, 75, Finnish Olympic sprint canoer (1964, 1968, 1972, 1976).
Gunilla Pontén, 90, Swedish fashion designer.
Santosh Rana, 76, Indian writer and politician, MLA (1977–1982), cancer.
Jim Reed, 93, American racing driver.
Jim Roberts, 97, English architect (Rotunda).
Whitney North Seymour Jr., 95, American politician and U.S. Attorney for the Southern District of New York (1970–1973), member of the New York State Senate (1966–1968).
Rakesh Shukla, 71, Indian cricketer.
Kirsti Simonsuuri, 73, Finnish writer and poet, complications from cancer and Parkinson's disease.
Sun Zhongliang, 82, Chinese electrical engineer, academician of the Chinese Academy of Engineering.
Sir Kenneth Warren, 92, British politician, MP for Hastings (1970–1983) and Hastings and Rye (1983–1992).

30
Sebastián Alarcón, 70, Chilean film director and screenwriter (Night Over Chile), cancer.
David Binder, 88, American journalist (The New York Times), kidney disease.
Amadou Boiro, 23, Senegalese footballer (Gimnàstic de Tarragona).
Momir Bulatović, 62, Montenegrin politician, President of the Republic of Montenegro (1990–1998) and Prime Minister of the Federal Republic of Yugoslavia (1998–2000), heart attack.
Helmut Diefenthal, 95, German-born American radiologist.
Mitchell Feigenbaum, 74, American physicist, discoverer of Feigenbaum constants.
Doug Ford, 90, Australian cricketer (New South Wales).
Boris Gamaleya, 88, French poet, linguist and social activist.
Giovanni Giavazzi, 99, Italian politician, MEP (1979–1989).
James Gill, 91, New Zealand cricketer (Otago).
Glyn Houston, 93, Welsh actor (Doctor Who, The Sea Wolves).
David Koloane, 81, South African artist.
Luis Mercedes, 51, Dominican baseball player (Baltimore Orioles, San Francisco Giants), complications from diabetes.
Alexander Mitterhuber, 89, Austrian-born Canadian Olympic rower (1952).
Borka Pavićević, 72, Serbian dramaturge and newspaper columnist.
John Rafferty, 65, Canadian politician, MP (2008–2015), cancer.
Armando Salas, 73, Spanish cartoonist.
Anne Vanderlove, 80, Dutch-born French singer-songwriter.
Noel White, 89, British businessman and football club chairman (Liverpool).
Óscar Zolezzi, 94, Argentine Olympic rower (1948).

References

2019-06
 06